One of the largest components of the Public Service Alliance of Canada is the Union of National Defence Employees. 

They represent more than 19,000 civilian employees working in support of the Department of National Defence. This number includes members at the Communications Security Establishment, a number of employees of the Staff of the Personnel Support Programs and a growing number of private sector employers including Serco, Aramark, IMP, ATCO-Frontec.

History 
The UNDE was created in 1966 when civil servants were given the right to collective bargain.  The representatives of civil servants at the time the Civil Service Federation and the Civil Service Association of Canada decided to merge their membership in their departments.  So the National Defence Employees Association and the members belonging to the Civil Service Association of Canada working in National Defence merged to form the UNDE.  The Civil Service Federation and Civil Service Association of Canada then merged to form the Public Service Alliance of Canada.

Executive 
President
June Winger
Executive Vice-President
Paul Jones
also==
UNDE web page
Professional Institute of the Public Service of Canada
International Brotherhood of Electrical Workers

Trade unions in Canada
Defence and munitions trade unions

Trade unions established in 1966
Public Service Alliance of Canada